The SCR-784 was a radar set used by the U.S. Army designed to be an amphibious version of the SCR-584,  to control the fire of anti-aircraft batteries, and mounted on a searchlight trailer called a K-84. The set was used to guide the flare plane over the target.

Statistics 
Frequency: 2,800 MHz
Pulse Width: 0.8 µs
Pulse Repetition Rate: 1707 pps 
Vertical Coverage: 
Indicator Type: display 7 inch PPI and, two 3 inch CRT's for range determination

K-84 trailer
 built by Fruehauf Trailer Corporation
 Tires are 9.00 X 20. 10 Ply.
 Electric brakes, and parking brake.
 Overall length 220-3/8"
 Overall width 97-3/4"

Surviving examples
There are no known surviving examples of this array.

See also 
 List of U.S. Signal Corps Vehicles
 Signal Corps Radio
 G-numbers

References

Further reading
 TM 9-2800 Military Vehicles, October 1947
 TM 11-1354
 TM 11-1454
 TM 11-1554
 TM 9-873
 SNL G-714

External links 
 Radar Descriptions - Mobile Military Radar.mobileradar.org.
 http://www.campevans.org/_CE/html/smpr83p25.html report on scr-784
 https://images.google.com/hosted/life/l?imgurl=ac8728dc4f57ea22&q=mobile+radar+source:life&usg=__bIHfrqpGapgmikx-GCl7ANOKLKw=&prev=/images%3Fq%3Dmobile%2Bradar%2Bsource:life%26hl%3Den
 http://sill-www.army.mil/famag/1948/NOV_DEC_1948/NOV_DEC_1948_COVER_TOC.pdf

Military radars of the United States
Gun laying radars
World War II radars
World War II American electronics
Analog computers
SCR784
Fruehauf Trailer Corporation
Military equipment introduced from 1945 to 1949